The canton of Brebières is an administrative division of the Pas-de-Calais department, in northern France. It was created at the French canton reorganisation which came into effect in March 2015. Its seat is in Brebières.

It consists of the following communes: 

Arleux-en-Gohelle 
Bellonne
Biache-Saint-Vaast
Boiry-Notre-Dame
Brebières
Cagnicourt
Corbehem
Dury
Étaing
Éterpigny
Fresnes-lès-Montauban
Fresnoy-en-Gohelle
Gouy-sous-Bellonne
Hamblain-les-Prés
Haucourt
Hendecourt-lès-Cagnicourt
Izel-lès-Équerchin
Neuvireuil
Noyelles-sous-Bellonne
Oppy
Pelves
Plouvain
Quiéry-la-Motte
Récourt
Rémy
Riencourt-lès-Cagnicourt
Rœux
Sailly-en-Ostrevent
Saudemont
Tortequesne 
Villers-lès-Cagnicourt
Vis-en-Artois
Vitry-en-Artois

References

Cantons of Pas-de-Calais